Ian Charles Powell (born December 16, 1985) is a former British competitive swimmer and was inducted as 21st Sporting Hero of the Sporting Hall of Fame in Guernsey  (Channel islands).  Powell specialized in butterfly and backstroke and his best finish was a third place at the British Swimming Championships in 2009 finishing in a time of 1.58.66 seconds to set a new Guernsey record for the event.

Charity work 
In 2011, Powell was invited as the official Ambassador for the Skipton Swimarathon to work with sponsors Skipton International in order to help communicate the benefits of swimming and encourage people to sign up and raise funds for local good causes.

Personal life 
Powell is currently living in the San Francisco Bay Area in the United States and swims at the Walnut Creek Masters swim team.

References 

Living people
1985 births
British male swimmers
Guernsey sportsmen
Commonwealth Games competitors for Guernsey
Swimmers at the 2002 Commonwealth Games
Swimmers at the 2006 Commonwealth Games
Swimmers at the 2010 Commonwealth Games